Uitgeest railway station is located in Uitgeest, the Netherlands. The station was opened on 1 May 1867 at the junction of the Den Helder–Amsterdam and the Haarlem–Uitgeest railways. A new station building was opened in 2006. The station has 3 platforms.

Train services
, the following services call at Uitgeest:
2x per hour local service (sprinter) Uitgeest - Zaandam - Amsterdam - Woerden - Rotterdam (all day, every day)
2x per hour local service (sprinter) Uitgeest - Zaandam - Amsterdam - Utrecht - Rhenen (only on weekdays until 8:00PM)
2x per hour local service (sprinter) Hoorn - Alkmaar - Uitgeest - Haarlem - Amsterdam (all day, every day)

Bus services

Gallery

External links
NS website 
Dutch public transport travel planner 

Railway stations in North Holland
Railway stations opened in 1867
Railway stations on the Staatslijn K
Uitgeest